Natalie Ann Jacobs (born August 16, 1997) is an American professional soccer player who last played as a defender for the Houston Dash.

Early life
Jacobs grew up in Coto de Caza, California. She is the daughter of Jeff and Teresa Jacobs. Her father captained the U.S. Air Force Academy soccer team. Jacobs was a 2013 and 2014 NSCAA Youth All-American. She played club soccer for Slammers FC and graduated from Tesoro High School in 2015.

Notre Dame
Jacobs played for Notre Dame 2015-2017. In her freshman season, she played in 20 games and made 15 starts for the Irish. Jacobs scored five goals and notched five assists, including a game-winning assist to beat No. 1 ranked Virginia. She was named to the All-ACC Freshman Team and to TopDrawerSoccer.com's Freshman Best XI Second Team. She sat out the 2016 season to play in the U-20 World Cup with the United States. In 2017, as a redshirt sophomore, she led the Irish in goals, scoring 13 goals and 7 assists. Jacobs also played a team-high of 1,745 minutes, appearing in 22 games for the Irish. She led the ACC in conference goals and was named to the all-ACC second team.

University of Southern California
Jacobs transferred to the University of Southern California in 2018. As a redshirt junior, she played in all 22 games, making 17 starts for the Trojans. She scored 5 goals and made 2 assists, including a goal in each of her first two games. In her final season, she played in all 23 games and made 21 starts for the Trojans. She scored four goals and led the team with nine assists. The Trojans advanced the quarterfinals of the NCAA quarterfinals where Jacobs scored against the University of North Carolina but ultimately the Tar Heels defeated the Trojans 3–2.

Club career

Washington Spirit
In the 2020 NWSL College Draft, the Washington Spirit drafted Jacobs with the 13th overall pick. Jacobs made her NWSL debut in the 2020 NWSL Challenge Cup on July 1, 2020. She played in 7 games of the Spirit's 9 games during the abbreviated 2020 season. Overall she earned 5 starts and played a total of 397 minutes. Jacobs signed a new, two-year contract with the Spirit after the 2020 season and she joined the team for preseason in February 2021.

Houston Dash
Jacobs was with the Dash briefly in 2022.

References

External links
 Notre Dame profile
 USC profile
 Natalie Jacobs on Twitter
 Natalie Jacobs on Instagram

1997 births
Living people
American women's soccer players
Soccer players from California
People from Coto de Caza, California
Women's association football utility players
Notre Dame Fighting Irish women's soccer players
USC Trojans women's soccer players
Washington Spirit draft picks
Washington Spirit players
United States women's under-20 international soccer players
National Women's Soccer League players